The New York City Department of Health and Mental Hygiene Police is responsible for providing on-site security services at the 5 New York City Health and Mental Hygiene clinics operated by the New York City Board of Health.

The New York City Police Department respond to all incidents that occur at NYC department of Health and Mental Hygiene facilities, they are the primary Policing and investigation agency within the New York City as per the NYC Charter (law).

Power and authority
New York City Health and Mental officers are classified as a NYC Special Officer and are appointed in connection with their special duties of employment, and such designation confers limited Peace Officer powers upon the employee pursuant to New York State Criminal Procedure Law § 2.10(27). 

The exercise of these powers is limited to the employee's geographical area of employment and only while such employee is actually on duty, as listed in Chapter 13 subsection (C): Special Patrolmen.

Equipment
NYC Health and Metal hygiene Special Officer are prohibited by New York State Law (Criminal Procedure Law) to use or carry a firearm, but do carry a Baton, handcuffs, a flashlight, a radio that is directly linked to other officers, and a Bullet-resistant vest.

DOHMH (Police) use marked Toyota Prius vehicles, with a similar color scheme to other NYC Law Enforcement agencies (white vehicle, with thick blue decals). The vehicles are marked "DOHMH" on the sides, with the DOHMH Police patch and "POLICE" on the wings. They have red-white flashing lights. Some vehicles also have a unit number. All carry New York plates.

Ranks
New York City Health and Mental Hygiene Special Officer are hired under the civil service title and are subject to advancement upon provisional or civil service appointment to the title of Supervising Special Patrolman (I or II).

This includes:

See also
 List of law enforcement agencies in New York (state)
 New York City Department of Health and Hospitals Police (HHCPD)

References

Law enforcement agencies of New York City
New York City Department of Health and Mental Hygiene
Specialist police departments of New York (state)